Larmor is a crater on the Moon's far side. It is located to the east-southeast of Shayn and due north of Dante. It is named in honor of the physicist Joseph Larmor.

The rim of Larmor is broken across by the satellite crater Larmor Z. The remaining rim is slightly worn, particularly to the southwest, and the inner wall is somewhat wider at the southern end. The wider southern inner wall displays terrace structures. Near the midpoint of the otherwise relatively level interior floor are some low hill features.

The satellite crater Larmor Q, located about one and a half crater diameters to the southwest of Larmor, lies at the center of a ray system. These rays lie primarily within cones to the north and southeast, which a 120° arc to the west is free of ray material.

Satellite craters
By convention these features are identified on lunar maps by placing the letter on the side of the crater midpoint that is closest to Larmor.

References

External links
 Oblique view of Larmor Q from Lunar Reconnaissance Orbiter

Impact craters on the Moon